Calor is a studio album by Julio Iglesias. It was released in 1992 on Columbia Records.

Reception 
In the United States the album peaked at number 186 on the Billboard 200 chart for the week of June 6, 1992.

Calor was nominated for Grammy Award for Best Latin Pop Album, but didn't win.

Track listing

Charts

Certifications

See also
List of number-one albums of 1992 (Spain)

References 

1992 albums
Julio Iglesias albums
Columbia Records albums